The Stele of Bongseon Honggyeongsa Temple was designated as the seventh National Treasure of Korea on December 12, 1962. 

The Bongseon Honggyeongsa Temple was built in 1021 during the reign of King Hyeonjong who built the temple in accordance with the wishes of his father King Anjong and because he was inspired by the Lotus Sutra.  "Bongseon", which means "In Reverence of Father's Wishes”, was added to the name of the temple. The stele commemorates the construction of the temple which was set up in 1026 CE, five years after the temple was constructed.  The stele is all that remains of the temple.  

The inscription of the stele was composed by Choi Chung also known as Haedonggongja, one of the greatest Confucian scholars and writers during the Goryeo Dynasty, and the calligraphy, in semi-cursive style, was done by Baek Hyeonrye.  The inscription describes the foundation of the temple.

The stone stele rests on a pedestal shaped like a tortoise.  The dragon-heads of the pedestal are facing the side instead of the front, a style that has often been used in East Asian stele.  The head is also carved with fin-like wings that give the head the impression of dynamism and motion.  The body of the stele is capped with a stone that is rounded and shows a dragon in the clouds.

The stele is currently located in Seonghwan-eup, Cheonan City in South Chungcheong province.

See also
National treasures of Korea
Stele

External links
Cultural Heritage Administration

National Treasures of South Korea
Cheonan
Goryeo
Korean inscriptions
11th-century inscriptions
Bongseon
Buildings and structures completed in 1021
11th-century establishments in Korea
1021 establishments in Asia
11th-century religious buildings and structures
Outdoor sculptures in South Korea